Bagdah or Bagdaha may refer to:
 Bagdah (community development block), a community development block in the state of West Bengal
 Bagdah, North 24 Parganas, a village under the Bagdah CD Block
 Bagdah (Vidhan Sabha constituency), a Vidhan Sabha constituency of West Bengal

Others
 Bagdah High School, a higher secondary school situated at Bagdah
 Bagda, a village in Kutch district in Gujarat
 Bagdaha, Nepal, a village development committee in Sarlahi District in Nepal